The Navoi Theater ("Alisher Navoi State Academic Big Theatre") is the national opera theater in Tashkent, Uzbekistan.

Overview
In 1929,  amateurs of concert-ethnographic group led by M. Kari-Yakubov was established and later founded the professional theatre. In 1939 it was renamed to the Uzbek State Opera and Ballet Theatre, and in March 1948 it was united with Russian theatre and called as the State Opera and Ballet Theatre named after Alisher Navoi. Later, in 1959 the theatre obtained the status of Academic theatre and in 1966 – the status of Bolshoi Theatre,

Designed by Alexey Shchusev, the building of the theater was built in 1942-1947 and was opened to the public in November, 1947, celebrating the 500th anniversary of the birth of Alisher Navoi, the greatest representative of Chagatai literature. During 1945–47, the Japanese prisoners of war participated in the building construction under forced labor.

The theater has a capacity of 1,400 spectators. The main stage is 540 square meters big.

See also

 Ilkhom Theater

References

 

Buildings and structures in Tashkent
Opera houses in Uzbekistan
Theatre in Uzbekistan
Theatres completed in 1947
Music venues completed in 1947
Tourist attractions in Tashkent
Academic theatres